Scoglio Torre della Scuola Lighthouse is an active lighthouse located   from the north-eastern tip of Palmaria in the Gulf of La Spezia.

Description

See also
List of lighthouses in Italy

References

External links

 Servizio Fari Marina Militare

Lighthouses in Italy